Karel Bětík (born October 28, 1978) is a Czech former professional ice hockey defenceman. He was drafted in the fifth round, 112th overall, by the Tampa Bay Lightning in the 1997 NHL Entry Draft. He played three games in the National Hockey League with the Lightning, during the 1998–99 season, scoring two assists.

Career statistics

Regular season and playoffs

External links

1978 births
Living people
Bakersfield Condors (1998–2015) players
B.C. Icemen players
Cleveland Lumberjacks players
Czech ice hockey defencemen
Detroit Vipers players
Flint Generals players
Kelowna Rockets players
Rockford IceHogs (UHL) players
Sportspeople from Ostrava
Tampa Bay Lightning draft picks
Tampa Bay Lightning players
Toledo Storm players
Czech expatriate ice hockey players in Canada
Czech expatriate ice hockey players in the United States